Denzong Boys Football Club (DBFC) is a professional football club in Sikkim, India. A wing of Denzong Welfare Association, it was formed in 2008. They played in I-League 2nd Division.

See also
Football clubs in Sikkim

References

Denzong Boys FC
Football clubs in Sikkim
I-League clubs
2008 establishments in Sikkim
Association football clubs established in 2008
I-League 2nd Division clubs